Belfast Bloomfield was a constituency of the Parliament of Northern Ireland.

Boundaries
Belfast Bloomfield was a borough constituency comprising part of eastern Belfast.  It was created in 1929 when the House of Commons (Method of Voting and Redistribution of Seats) Act (Northern Ireland) 1929 introduced first past the post elections throughout Northern Ireland.

Belfast Bloomfield was created by the division of Belfast East into four new constituencies.  It survived unchanged, returning one member of Parliament, until the Parliament of Northern Ireland was temporarily suspended in 1972, and then formally abolished in 1973.

Politics
The constituency was the most staunchly unionist in East Belfast.  It was held continuously by Ulster Unionist Party candidates, although labour movement candidates sometimes polled well.

Members of Parliament

Election results

At the 1929 and 1933 general elections, Herbert Dixon was elected unopposed.

References

Bloomfield
Northern Ireland Parliament constituencies established in 1929
Northern Ireland Parliament constituencies disestablished in 1973